Naso maculatus is a tropical fish found in coral reefs in the Pacific ocean. It is commonly known as the spotted unicornfish, but this name may also refer to Naso brevirostris. It has a maximum length of 60 cm.

References

Naso (fish)
Fish described in 1981